Night in New Orleans is a 1942 American crime film directed by William Clemens and loosely adapted by Jonathan Latimer from the 1940 novel Sing a Song of Homicide by James R. Langham. The film stars Preston Foster, Patricia Morison, Albert Dekker, Charles Butterworth, Dooley Wilson and Paul Hurst. The film was released on July 1, 1942, by Paramount Pictures.

Plot

Steve Abbott and Bill Richards are both lieutenants in the New Orleans police department, colleagues and rivals alike. Steve, seeking love letters his wife Ethel once wrote to a Phillip Wallace, finds the man's dead body and immediately becomes Bill's prime suspect. Both report to Dan Odell, their chief.

Ethel, an amateur detective, investigates on her own while her husband's under suspicion. The trail leads to the Mississippi Inn on the riverfront, where house man Shadrach Jones proves helpful to her. Steve's suspicions turn toward the dead man's brothers, George and Edward, particularly to the former, who runs the casino, helped by girlfriend Janet Price. His boss, Odell, meanwhile, sternly advises Ethel to stay away from the case.

After the slain body of George is discovered, a costumed Edward tries to escape during the Mardi Gras parade as the detectives deduce him to be the killer of his brothers. Steve and Bill join forces for his capture, with an assist from Ethel.

Cast 
Preston Foster as Police Lt. Steve Abbott
Patricia Morison as Ethel Abbott
Albert Dekker as Police Lieutenant William Richards
Charles Butterworth as Edward Wallace
Dooley Wilson as Shadrach Jones
Paul Hurst as Sergeant Casper Riordan
Jean Phillips as Janet Price
Cecil Kellaway as Dan Odell
William Wright as George Wallace
Noble Johnson as Carney
Joe Pope as Carlson
Yola d'Avril as Mme. Lamballe
Emory Parnell as Jensen

Reception
T.S. of The New York Times said, "After changing its name three times, Night in New Orleans descended upon the Rialto yesterday. An appropriate title it is, too, because the picture is about as lucid as a blackout. As a story of murder and municipal skulduggery in Huey Long's one-time parish, it is a thriller so haphazardly contrived, so studded with loose clues and endless coincidence, that even the author seems to have been confused by his meandering fable. Around Preston Foster and Patricia Morison, as a police lieutenant and harebrained spouse who bear a wee resemblance to Mr. and Mrs. North, the producers have rigged an unsteady story of sweet-faced old crooks, blond honky-tonk floozies, thick-headed and toughspoken cops, and the inevitable colored servant who makes sounds of appropriate comic alarm when the lights go out or a body suddenly splashes off a fogbound wharf."

References

External links 
 

1942 films
1940s English-language films
Paramount Pictures films
American crime films
1942 crime films
Films directed by William Clemens
Films produced by Sol C. Siegel
American black-and-white films
Films scored by Paul Sawtell
1940s American films